Thaxterogaster occidentalis is a species of fungus in the family Cortinariaceae.

Taxonomy 
It was described in 1939 by the American mycologist Alexander H. Smith who classified it as Cortinarius occidentalis.

In 2022 the species was transferred from Cortinarius and reclassified as Thaxterogaster occidentalis based on genomic data.

Habitat and distribution 

Native to the Northern Hemisphere.

References

occidentalis
Fungi described in 1939
Taxa named by Alexander H. Smith